Danyi is a prefecture located in the Plateaux Region of Togo. The prefecture seat is located in Danyi-Apéyémé.

Cantons of Danyi include Danyi-Atigba, Ahlon, Danyi-Kakpa, Yikpa, Danyi-Kpéto, Evita, and Danyi-Elavagnon.

Danyi and Agou were split of from the district of Kloto. Kpalime is the major urban center serving the area.

References 

Prefectures of Togo
Plateaux Region, Togo